Both Worlds *69 is the second solo studio album by American rapper Gangsta Boo. It was released in July 31, 2001 via Hypnotize Minds/Loud Records. Recording sessions took place at Hypnotized Minds Studio in Memphis. Production was handled by DJ Paul and Juicy J. The album peaked at number 29 on the Billboard 200 and at number 8 on the Top R&B/Hip-Hop Albums chart in the United States.

Track listing

Chart history

References

External links

2001 albums
Gangsta Boo albums
Albums produced by DJ Paul
Albums produced by Juicy J